Nemi Saran Jain (born 2 April 1899) was a India Command politician and Member of parliament in the 1st Lok Sabha representing Bijnor.

References 

1899 births
Indian National Congress politicians
India MPs 1952–1957
Year of death missing
Indian National Congress politicians from Uttar Pradesh